The Guitar may refer to:

 The guitar, the musical instrument
 The Guitar (film), a 2008 film starring Saffron Burrows
 "The Guitar" (The Lion Sleeps Tonight), a song and EP by They Might Be Giants

See also 
 Guitar (disambiguation)